Edward "Porky" Cragg (September 8, 1919 – missing in action December 26, 1943 – finding of death January 16, 1946) was a triple ace (15 kills) and a major in the United States Army Air Forces.

Biography

Early life
Edward Cragg was born at Mount Vernon, New York, on September 8, 1919. He spent his youth in the Greenwich / Cos Cob area of Connecticut, graduating from Greenwich High School in the class of 1936. In September 1937, he enrolled in the School of Commerce, Accounts and Finance at New York University, New York. He was working towards a Bachelor of Science degree in accounting. In September 1940, he withdrew from the university to enlist.

World War II

He enlisted as a flying cadet on November 30, 1940. He received his elementary training at Albany, Georgia, his basic training at Gunter Field, Alabama, from February to April 1941, and his advanced flying training at the Air Corps Advanced Flying School, Craig Field, Selma, Alabama. He was appointed a second lieutenant, Air Reserve, on July 11, 1941, and was ordered to active duty on the following day.

Upon graduation from Advanced Flying School, he remained at the school until July 1941, when he was ordered to the Panama Canal Zone for duty as Assistant Squadron Engineering Officer. He later becoming Engineering Officer of the 28th Pursuit Squadron, 37th Pursuit Group, stationed at Albrook Field in the Panama Canal Zone. While there, he was promoted to first lieutenant on September 5, 1942.

In spring 1942, he was reassigned to what was then designated the 80th Pursuit Squadron, part of the 8th Pursuit Group, Fifth Air Force, in the Southwest Pacific theater. Both the squadron and group were soon redesignated from "Pursuit" to "Fighter". Initially, the squadron flew P-39 Airacobras. Cragg named his "Porky", and soon acquired the nickname of "Porky". He was promoted to captain on December 17, 1942

On April 8, 1943, he became the commander of the 80th. Among his first actions was naming the squadron "The Headhunters" after the local New Guinean headhunter tribes, who hated the Japanese and helped to rescue downed pilots. He also commissioned crew chief Yale Saffro, a former Walt Disney Studios artist, to design the 80th's patch, the likeness of the proud Papuan Chief of New Guinea. Squadron lore credits him with arranging the equipping of the squadron with the new P-38 Lightning aircraft. He named his "Porky II".

During his tenure with the squadron, he compiled an air-to-air combat record of 15 confirmed kills and 2 probable kills. He was promoted to major on July 6, 1943.

He served as commander of the Headhunters until he was reported missing in action over New Britain on December 26, 1943. During that final mission he shot down his final kill. He was succeeded in command of the Headhunters by fellow squadron member and ace Major Jay "Cock" Robbins.

Aerial victory credits

Decorations
His decorations include:

Distinguished Service Cross citation

Cragg, Edward
Major (Air Corps), U.S. Army Air Forces
80th Fighter Squadron, 8th Fighter Group, Fifth Air Force
Date of Action:  August 21, 1943

Citation:

The President of the United States of America, authorized by Act of Congress, July 9, 1918, takes pleasure in presenting the Distinguished Service Cross to Major (Air Corps) Edward Cragg, United States Army Air Forces, for extraordinary heroism in connection with military operations against an armed enemy while serving as Pilot of a P-38 Fighter Airplane in the 80th Fighter Squadron, 8th Fighter Group, Fifth Air Force, in aerial combat against enemy forces near Wewak, New Guinea, on 21 August 1943. Major Cragg, commanding his fighter squadron, escorted a bomber formation attacking an Airdrome. About twenty enemy interceptors were encountered. With all his squadron engaged, he observed ten additional enemy fighters about to deliver a coordinated attack on our bombers. With great daring, he throttled back, and using his plane as a decoy, diverted their concentrated attack upon himself. This action enabled our bombers to make an accurate and successful run unmolested. He then acted as sole fighter escort for the bombers on the return journey, shooting down one enemy plane and damaging another en route. In deliberately engaging ten enemy fighters single-handed, Major Cragg acted with conspicuous gallantry and contributed greatly to the success of the mission.

See also
List of people who disappeared

References

Ace Pilots
HeadHunters Association WWII History
HeadHunters Association Patch History
National Archives 
Air Force Historical Research Agency, Aerial Victory Credits search on Name begins with "Cragg", exclude those of Ernest Cragg

 Academic Records - Transcripts & Certification, Office of the University Registrar, New York University, PO Box 910, NY, NY 10276-4280
 Edward Cragg Biography, General Officer Biographies Volume C. Available from United States Army Center of Military History, Fort Lesley J. McNair, DC.
 Ernest T Cragg Oral History interview March 1994

External links
Porky Cragg at aceesofww2.com
Edward "Porky" Cragg Memorial Web Page

1919 births
1943 deaths
American World War II flying aces
Aviators killed by being shot down
Recipients of the Distinguished Service Cross (United States)
Recipients of the Silver Star
Recipients of the Distinguished Flying Cross (United States)
Recipients of the Air Medal
Burials at Arlington National Cemetery
Greenwich High School alumni
Missing in action of World War II
United States Army Air Forces officers
United States Army Air Forces personnel killed in World War II
United States Army Air Forces pilots of World War II
People declared dead in absentia